Porbandar district is one of the 33 districts of Gujarat state in western India. The district covers an area of 2,316 km2. It had a population of 5.85,449 of which 48.77% were urban as of 2011 census This district was carved out of Junagadh District. It lies on the Kathiawar peninsula. Porbandar city is the administrative headquarters of this district. This district is surrounded by Jamnagar district and Devboomi Dwarka to the north, Junagadh district and Rajkot district to the east and the Arabian Sea to the west and south.

As of 2011 it is the second least-populous district of Gujarat (out of 33), after Dang.

History
Porbandar is the birthplace of Mahatma Gandhi. Porbandar is also mentioned in the Mahabharata as the native place of Krishna's childhood friend Sudama. As per the mythological reference in Sudama Charitra of Skand Puran of Shrimad Bhagvad, the present Porbandar city was names after Goddess Porav, and was located along the river banks of Asmavati

Administration
Porbandar district has 3 talukas; Porbandar, Ranavav, Kutiyana.

Economy

Agriculture
The major crops produced in Porbander district are cotton, groundnut, bajra, gram, wheat, tal and jowar.

Demographics

According to the 2011 census Porbandar district has a population of 585,449, roughly equal to the nation of Solomon Islands or the US state of Wyoming. This gives it a ranking of 529th in India (out of a total of 640).
Its population growth rate over the decade 2001-2011 was 9.17%. Porbandar has a sex ratio of 947 females for every 1000 males, and a literacy rate of 76.63%. Scheduled Castes and Scheduled Tribes make up 8.85% and 2.23% of the population respectively.

Hindus are 93.90% while Muslims are 5.73% of the population.

At the time of the 2011 Census of India, 96.76% of the population in the district spoke Gujarati and 1.21% Hindi as their first language.

Politics
  

|}

Transportation
Airport: Porbandar airport serving the city Mumbai & Ahmedabad by direct daily flight.
Railway: Porbandar railway station connects Porbandar to whole country
Roads & Highways:

 N.H.-8B connects Porbandar to Rajkot
 GJ S.H. 06: Connects Kutchh to Valsad via Porbandar.
 GJ S.H. 27: Connects Jamnagar and Porbandar via Jamnagar-Lalpur-Ranavav–NH8B–Bhanvad.
 GJ S.H. 28: Connects Jamnagar and Porbandar via Khambhalia-Advana-Porbandar.
 GJ S.H. 31A. Connects Rajkot, Porbandar via Porbandar–Rajkot–Bamanbore road Passing Through Jetpur City Limit.
 N.H. 51 and N.H. 27 also intersects at Porbandar.

Notable personalities
Mohandas Karamchand Gandhi (1869–1948) The pre-eminent political and ideological leader of India during the Indian independence movement. Born in Porbandar.
Vijaygupta Maurya (1909–1992) Science writer. Born in Porbandar.
Dilip Joshi (playing the role of Jethalal Gada in Tarak Mehta Ka Ooltah Chashmah)
Nanji Kalidas Mehta (Business Tycoon and a Grandfather-in-law of Juhi Chawla)

References

External links

 Official website
Collectorate website

 
Districts of Gujarat
1997 establishments in Gujarat